Celia Álvarez Muñoz (born 1937) is a Chicana mixed-media conceptual artist and photographer based in Arlington, Texas.

Early life and education

Álvarez Muñoz was born in El Paso, Texas to Enriqueta Limón Alvarez and Francisco Pompa Alvarez. She grew up in the Chihuahuita historical neighborhood of El Paso. Prior to becoming an artist, Álvarez Muñoz worked as a fashion illustrator and an elementary school art educator. She decided to commit to creating art in the 1970s, by 1977 she enrolled in graduate school to study art. She earned her Masters of Fine Arts at North Texas State University, Denton.

Drawing on her experiences living near the US-Mexico border, Álvarez Muñoz's work addresses the tension between linguistic, cultural, and political worlds. She often incorporates themes of family and "communal memories" in her work. She uses text and images in her work to explore the ambiguous signs and signifiers where cultures meet, and to communicate stories of American history, culture, and society. She has exhibited her work in museums and galleries in the U.S. and abroad, and is included in the collection of the Museum of New Mexico. Her work has been written about by art historians, Lucy Lippard, Benito Huerta, and others. In Roberto Tejada's monograph on Muñoz, he includes a teaching guide (Vol. 3) using principles from her work in the teaching of multicultural art, and border issues.

Selected solo exhibitions
 1988 – The Lannan Museum, Lake Worth, Florida
 1989 – New Langton Arts, San Francisco 
 1989 – Bridge Center for Contemporary Art, El Paso, Texas
 1994 – "A Brand New Ball Game", Capp Street Project, San Francisco
 1991– "Concentrations 26: Celia Alvarez Munoz, Abriendo Tierra/Breaking Ground", Dallas Museum of Art

Selected group exhibitions
Álvarez Muñoz has exhibited at;
 1991 – Whitney Biennial of American Art, New York City
 1992 – Museum of Contemporary Art San Diego
 2002 – "Stories Your Mother Never Told You" (traveling retrospective), Blue Star ArtSpace, El Paso Museum of Art, and Mexic-Arte Museum
 2006–2007 – "Frontera 450+", Station Museum of Contemporary Art, Houston, Texas
 2009 – "Chicana Badgirls: Las Hociconas", 516 ARTS, Albuquerque, New Mexico
 2009 – "Rastros y Crónicas: Mujerez de Juarez", National Museum of Mexican Art, Chicago, Illinois 
 2012 – "Artifactual Realities", Station Museum of Contemporary Art, Houston, Texas
 2014 – "Unbound: Contemporary Art After Frida Kahlo", Museum of Contemporary Art, Chicago (MCA)

References

Further reading 

 Roberto Tejada, Celia Alvarez Muñoz, University of Minnesota Press, 2009.

External links

1937 births
Living people
Artists from El Paso, Texas
People from Arlington, Texas
American artists of Mexican descent
American conceptual artists
Women conceptual artists
University of North Texas alumni
20th-century American artists
21st-century American artists
Hispanic and Latino American artists
20th-century American women photographers
20th-century American photographers
21st-century American women photographers
21st-century American photographers